Greta Morgan Salpeter (born February 12, 1988), better known as Greta Morgan, is an American singer-songwriter and musician based in Los Angeles, CA.  Her career began in 2005 as singer/pianist of the Chicago-based band The Hush Sound. She later formed the band Gold Motel, whose debut album was released on June 1, 2010. Since 2014, she performs under the name Springtime Carnivore and has released two albums.

Music career
Morgan began learning piano at a young age, studying classical music. She first met Bob Morris, guitarist/vocalist  in 2001. The two started playing together and created The Hush Sound, later recruiting Chris Faller on bass and Darren Wilson on drums. She was 16 when she began touring with The Hush Sound.

In 2009, Morgan began recording material with the band Gold Motel.

Together with La Sera's Katy Goodman, Morgan formed the duo Books of Love; they released the song "Space Time" in 2013.

In 2012, Morgan began working on a solo project called Springtime Carnivore and recorded a six-track EP, which was self-released in September of that year. In November 2014, she released a self-titled album through Autumn Tone Records. It was followed by a tour in early 2015 as support to The Dodos.

In early 2016, Morgan again got together with Goodman and recorded a number of punk rock covers with 1960s pop arrangements. It was released in August 2016 as Take It, It's Yours through Polyvinyl, and described by Pitchfork as "one of the comfiest cover-sets in recent memory". On October 7, 2016, her project Springtime Carnivore released their second album, Midnight Room.

In 2018, Morgan joined the new live line-up of Vampire Weekend on keyboards, guitar and vocals. Morgan is also a distant relative of Vampire Weekend vocalist Ezra Koenig.
 
As well as being a vocalist and pianist, Morgan has also been known to play the guitar, bass guitar, and drums.

Discography

Albums

As Springtime Carnivore 
 Midnight Room (2016)
 Springtime Carnivore (2014)

With Katy Goodman 
 Take It, It's Yours (2016)
 "Space Time" as Books of Love (2013)

With Gold Motel 
 Gold Motel (2012)
 Summer House (2010)

With The Hush Sound
 Tidal Wave (2013)
 Forty Five (2013)
 Goodbye Blues (2008)
 Like Vines (2006)
 So Sudden (2005)

External links
 Springtime Carnivore on Bandcamp

References

1988 births
Living people
American women pianists
American women rock singers
Singers from Illinois
People from Oak Brook, Illinois
21st-century American women singers
21st-century American singers
21st-century American pianists
Vampire Weekend members
The Hush Sound members